Jon Pyong-ho (20 March 1926 – 7 July 2014) was a North Korean officer and politician who served as the Chief Secretary of the Korean Workers Party (KWP) Committee of the North Korean Cabinet, and director of the DPRK Cabinet Political Bureau before his retirement in 2010. Jon was described as the 'Chief architect of North Korea's nuclear programme'. Jon was a general of the Korean People's Army and a close adviser to the late Kim Jong-il.

Jon played a key role in the production and development of North Korean defense industry for more than four decades before retiring in 2011. Jon supervised the development of the country's long-range ballistic missile programmes and was involved with its first test of a nuclear device in 2006 directly. Jon was reported to help broker a deal with Pakistan during the 1990s that gave North Korea critical technology for its uranium enrichment programme in exchange for North Korea's missile technology. Jon was sanctioned by the United Nations as a result of his involvement in the country's nuclear and missile weapons programmes.

He was born in Musan County, in North Hamgyong Province, and was educated at the Ural Engineering College in the Soviet Union, where he graduated in 1950. He has since held a number of positions within the North Korean military and government, and was appointed member of the National Defense Commission in February 2009. In December 2011, he was named as one of the members of the funeral committee for the late supreme leader Kim Jong-il. He has been described as "a talented writer with an excellent knowledge of policy and process."

Death and funeral
On 7 July 2014 Jon Pyong-ho died of acute myocardial infarction at the age of 88. He was awarded a state funeral, attended by Kim Jong-un.

The funeral commission of Jon Pyong-ho, chaired by Kim Jong-un, was composed of the following individuals:

 Kim Jong-un
 Kim Yong-nam
 Pak Pong-ju
 Hwang Pyong-so
 Ri Yong-gil
 Hyon Yong-chol
 Kim Ki-nam
 Choe Tae-bok
 Choe Ryong-hae
 Pak To-chun
 Yang Hyong-sop
 Kang Sok-ju
 Ri Yong-mu
 O Kuk-ryol
 Kim Won-hong
 Kim Yang-gon
 Kim Phyong-hae
 Kwak Pom-gi
 O Su-yong
 Choe Pu-il
 Ro Tu-chol
 Jo Yon-jun
 Ri Il-hwan
 Kim Man-song
 Han Kwang-bok
 O Il-jong
 An Jong-su
 Kim Jong-im
 Kim Jung-hyop
 Han Kwang-sang
 Hong In-bom
 Kim Kyong-ok
 Ri Jae-il
 Choe Hwi
 Jon Il-chun
 Jong Myong-hak
 Kim Hi-taek
 Kang Kwan-il
 Hong Yong-chil
 Hong Sung-mu
 Jang Chang-ha
 Rim Chun-song
 Pyon In-son
 So Hong-chan
 Pak Yong-sik
 Ryom Chol-song
 Jo Kyong-chol
 Yun Tong-hyon
 Kang Phyo-yong
 Kim Hyong-ryong
 Kim Hyong-sik
 Ri Pyong-chol
 Kim Chun-sam
 Kim Yong-chol
 O Kum-chol
 Pak Jong-chon
 Kim Jong-gwan
 No Kwang-chol
 Tong Yong-il
 Ri Chang-han
 Ri Yong-ju
 Ri Gyu-man
 Jong Yong-hak
 Kim Thae-gu
 Rim Un-guk
 Kim Su-hak
 Pak Gwan-bok
 Yun Pyong-gwon
 An Ji-yong
 Ju Dong-chol
 Choe Jae-bok
 Kim Su-gil
 Tae Jong-su
 Pak Tae-song
 Ri Man-gon
 Jon Sung-hun
 Pak Yong-ho
 Pak Tae-dok
 Kim Chun-sop
 Pak Jong-nam
 Ri Sang-won
 Kang Yang-mo
 Rim Kyong-man
 Jo Chun Ryong
 Ju Kyu-chang
 Choe Chun-sik
 Ri Je-son
 Yu Jin
 Ri Song-hak

Awards and honors 
A frame displaying Jon's decorations was placed at the foot of his bier during his funeral.

References

North Korean military personnel
1926 births
2014 deaths
People from Musan County
People from North Hamgyong
Members of the 6th Politburo of the Workers' Party of Korea
Members of the 5th Central Committee of the Workers' Party of Korea
Members of the 6th Central Committee of the Workers' Party of Korea